Ada Natali (5 March 1898 – 27 April 1990) was an Italian politician. She served in the Italian Chamber of Deputies and was also the first woman to serve as mayor in Italy .

Ada natali's father was Giuseppe Natali, socialist and mayor of her native village, and her mother was Argia Germani, a teacher, she was born in Massa Fermana. She studied at the teaching institute in Ascoli Piceno , after receiving her qualifications in 1921, she taught at school in Massa Fermana for ten years. In 1929, she enrolled in the law faculty at the University of Macerata. In 1946, she was elected as the mayor of Massa Fermana after running as a candidate of the Italian Communist Party (PCI) and served in that post until 1959. In 1948, she was elected to the Chamber of Deputies as a member of the PCI.

During the 1950s, she supported the struggles of workers employed in hat factories to obtain a national contract of employment. Natali also served as director of the feminist .

She died in Massa Fermana at the age of 92.

References 

1898 births
1990 deaths
Deputies of Legislature I of Italy
Women mayors of places in Italy
University of Macerata alumni
Italian Communist Party politicians
Italian socialist feminists
Women members of the Chamber of Deputies (Italy)